Dizaj (also Romanized as Dīzaj; also known as Dīzak) is a village in Kharrazan Rural District, in the Central District of Tafresh County, Markazi Province, Iran. At the 2006 census, its population was 82, in 32 families.

References 

Populated places in Tafresh County